Professional Football Championship may refer to:

Professional American football championship games
Professional Football Championship (South Korea)